Stephanie Andrea Biddle (born 23 August 1963) is a Canadian jazz singer and actress.

Career 
Biddle was born in Quebec to jazz bassist Charlie Biddle and a French-Canadian mother. During part of her childhood she lived in Sainte-Agathe-des-Monts. When she was 15, she moved to Montreal and began modeling. From 1987–1989, she sang traditional pop and jazz standards at clubs and weddings with the band Living Proof. Aided by a record producer in Paris, she recorded the hit single "Dis-moi" (1991) which peaked at No. 11 on the French pop chart. For the next few years she sang in Le Gosier, Guadeloupe.

Biddle appeared in the films Crunch (1979), The Moderns (1988), The Whole Nine Yards (2000), One Eyed King (2001), and in the television movie A Diva's Christmas Carol with Vanessa L. Williams. She performed in La Haut at Rouen Opera House. She also had a role in the 2001 French-language film Karmen Gei, "a re-make of the movie Carmen.

In 1991, her debut album, Dis-moi, was released,

Personal life 
Her brother Charles Jr. is also a performer. Her older sister Sonya Biddle was a former Montreal city councillor and her younger sister Tracy, a bartender and singer, is a freelance writer and hosted radio shows on CBC radio network.

References

External links
Official site

1963 births
Canadian people of African-American descent
Canadian women jazz singers
21st-century Black Canadian women singers
Canadian expatriates in Hong Kong
Canadian expatriates in China
People from LaSalle, Quebec
People from Sainte-Agathe-des-Monts
Singers from Montreal
Living people
20th-century Black Canadian women singers